Chubu Electric Power Rugby Football Club are a Japanese rugby union team, currently playing in the county's second tier Top Challenge League competition. The team is the rugby team of electric utilities provider Chubu Electric Power, based in Nisshin, Aichi Prefecture of the Chūbu region. The team is also known as Chuden, an acronym of the company's name in Japanese, Chūbu Denryoku.

In 1936, the Toho Electric Power company created a rugby union team; their operations were transferred to Chubu Electric Power according to Japan's National Mobilization Law, and the new Chubu Electric Power team was created in 1951. When rugby union in Japan was restructured in 2003 with the introduction of the Top League, Chubu Electric Power was allocated to the second tier Top West League. They remained in that league until a further restructuring prior to the 2017–18 saw the team promoted to a newly established Top Challenge League.

Season history

Chubu Electric Power's record in the top two tiers since the formation of the Top West League in 2003 was:

External links

References

Rugby in Kansai
Rugby clubs established in 1951
Sports teams in Aichi Prefecture
1951 establishments in Japan
Chubu Electric Power